Shake, Rattle and Roll 9 is a 2007 Filipino horror anthology film produced and distributed by Regal Entertainment, and the ninth installment of the Shake, Rattle & Roll film series. It is also an entry to the 2007 Metro Manila Film Festival.

The tenth installment, Shake, Rattle & Roll X, was released in 2008.

Plot

"Christmas Tree" 
Stephen (Nash Aguas), his mother Myrna (Gina Alajar), and his two sisters Hazel (Lovi Poe) and Eunice (Sophia Baars) planned to visit their Lola Susana (Boots Anson-Roa) during the Christmas Break. During the long journey, Stephen has a dream concerning his deceased father Chuck (Tonton Gutierrez): He was running along a forest where he encounters his father's ghost, who encouraged him to be brave for he is the only male member of his family. Chuck's ghost suddenly became a zombie, waking Stephen up, and receiving teases from his little sister.

Upon their arrival in Lola Susana's house, Jong (John Prats) had already erected their new 8 foot tall Christmas Tree.  A day before the Christmas Eve, the family eagerly decorated it, making it look elegant. However, something eerie grips into the atmosphere. During a night stroll, Stephen noticed Elton John, Jong's parrot had disappeared without a trace. Worse, even Eunice's giraffe doll, Gordon, was found torn to pieces, thus, blaming and resenting the latter's brother. Even their Yaya Sonny (John Lapus) wonders why the Tree is always getting taller and taller

After a sumptuous Christmas feast, the family was ready to sleep. However, Yaya Sonny, wanted to add a couple of Christmas balls. In a worse turn of fate, Sonny was tragically eaten by the Tree itself.

Things began to become tense. Stephen, having heard of the commotions downstairs, wakes his Ate Hazel to investigate. Jong then arrived to the scene next. The three witnessed the horrendous transformation of the Christmas Tree: All those times, there was a monstrous tree dwelling within the leaves of the Tree itself. Before they could run, Jong was knocked out by the monster. Thinking he was dead, Hazel and Stephen raced to their mother's room, narrating them that the Christmas Tree was truly alive. Myrna dismisses Stephen's story, telling him there were no such things as monsters.

Myrna was wrong: Judging by the stomps heard in the stairs, the Christmas Tree was now upstairs. She peered on the door, only to find out that the monster tree was outside. Danger and tension prevailed over the next events. Myrna warned Lola Susana to stay in the room, while Hazel and Stephen make a diversion, tripping the Christmas Tree.

Hazel and Stephen rushed to the kitchen, while Lola Susana, Myrna and Eunice escaped to the car. Hazel found something: acid. Stephen also found his Uncle Jong unconscious on the floor. Stephen knew that acid will kill the Tree. He, having experienced being a baseball player, threw the bottles of acid, missing the first two. At his third turn, the acid went straight into the Tree's mouth, killing it.

"Bangungot"
Marionne (Roxanne Guinoo) is a young and beautiful woman, who falls in love with Jerome (Dennis Trillo). They went on a date at an amusement park. However, a mysterious woman (Eugene Domingo) warns Marionne not to sleep otherwise she will die. Before the woman can exit the park, she encounters a red cloaked figure that strangles her, killing her in the process.

In her dorm, Marionne wakes startlingly, remembering it was a dream. Her office mate Tatin (Jaymee Joaquin) then saw her drawing a picture of the red-cloaked figure: the red-cloaked figure that strangled the woman in her dream. She remembered that her grandfather died of a bangungot (nightmare). Tatin said it was nonsense. Marionne, concerned for her grandfather's past, unlocked the latter's room. Shortly after she set foot, eerie things flew in the air.

The young woman was revealed to be a candle sales lady. She and Tatin have been friends. One day, her brother Tonton (Jayson Gainza) and a handsome man arrived at the shop. This man was Jerome: the same Jerome in Marionne's dream. The latter informed them that he will be leaving for one week; shockingly, he was engaged to a woman named Florence (Pauleen Luna), a fact that Marionne became jealous of.

Later on, a young girl (Andrea Torres) wants to order a large candle. Marionne notices the strange-looking parchment with strange words written in ink. She demands what is the girl's purpose for the candle. The latter said that: "if you want to dream of your love ones, and him to you", she must light a candle before sleeping, and chant the words in the parchment. But she must wake up before the candle is consumed otherwise she cannot leave the dream.

Eager to try this, Marionne kept the parchment and did as the girl said. After the ritual was performed, eerie events began to manifest to Jerome and Marionne. The red-cloaked figure reappeared and attempted to strangle the two. Thinking it was a hallucination, they both dismissed it.

Late at night, Marionne visited Jerome in the office, stating that she cannot sleep. She and Jerome began to hallucinate again: the phantom reappeared once more and tries to strangle them again. As they share a kiss of comfort, Florence appeared. Shocked by what she saw, she too was nearly strangled by the phantom, but was comforted by Jerome. Seeing this, Marionne cannot stand this, making her chase the two.

Jerome and Florence walked out of the shop, finally ending up in the peak of an overpass. Florence stumbled and she cannot walk. Meanwhile, the phantom once again reappeared, this time, Jerome confronts it and they both jumped off the overpass. Florence discovered that she too was dreaming.

Marionne, having witnessed of the events before, rushed into the hospital, where she reveals the shocking truth: she and Jerome entered a near-death state already after the spell was performed; this explains why Tonton, Florence and Tatin could not feel Marionne's presence. Florence told them everything, and so as Tatin: in a flashback, Marionne's astral projection saw herself performing the spell, afterwards, she collapsed in her bed, apparently dying. Tatin shook and jerked her up but she would not wake up. Florence's story matched Tatin's: the former found her fiancé hunched in the table but he was in the brink of death in his sleep. Another thing is: Marionne's grandfather did not die of a nightmare, but of a heart attack and the events happening now is only a bangungot for Marionne. Jerome, who was on a critical state, dreams of Marionne hugging him very tightly; it was revealed that Marionne was the bangungot all along. As Marionne and Jerome realize this, Florence cries and asks Jerome to wake up. Jerome tries his best, but Marionne holds him down, determined to spend the eternity with the man she loves, but does not love her back. Jerome eventually dies, followed by a struggling Marionne.

"Engkanto"
A teenage gothic band heads out for a gig in a remote province. During the long journey, not many of the young band members strike up a conversation, while, their manager Hans (Jojo Alejar) keeps complaining why he's the one who should drive. Vince (Mart Escudero), the band's leader and Richard (Matt Evans) have a small commotion, only to be stopped by Vince's ex-girlfriend Dang (Melissa Ricks).

The group stops by a small store beside the road. The others decide to relax while Vince and Dang disappear from view. The two latter confront each other; Vince reveals he will be leaving them soon, a fact that Dang objects strongly.

Back at the store, Lucio (Nanding Josef), a local townsfolk, warns them to stay in sight, for they might be kidnapped by an engkanto (forest guardian in Filipino mythology). He then tells of the story of his son Paeng (Sam Concepcion): the latter was gathering firewood when he was suddenly grabbed by someone or something. He then also explains that the engkanto was the reason why they are lost in the middle of nowhere.

Worse of all, the bus ran out of gas, forcing the band to take refuge in an abandoned resort. Dang, Ian and Tonee then encounter a young and beautiful woman clad in white. Tonee and Ian ask her where is the beach. They follow the woman's directions but were lost. Tonee loses her temper but Ian wants to court the young woman. Accidentally, he is bitten by the woman, who revealed to be the engkanto (Katrina Halili).

Vince then encounters Paeng, the aforementioned boy who was kidnapped by the engkanto. He, Dang and Richard demand that who did this to him and who is this. As they speak, the engkanto summons her slaves to hunt the band down. Hans, who was looking for gas, gets bitten. Meanwhile, Dang met a retreating Tonee informing the former that Ian was killed by the engkanto and was made into her slave. Suddenly, Tonee too was choked to death.

Paeng and Vince then lured the slaves to the beach, discovering they fear water. They formulated a plan: he and Dang will ward off the slaves while Paeng, Richard and Tikoy (Hector Macaso) refueled the bus. Paeng then noticed the tree beside them; this was supposed to be the engkanto's lair. They must burn it to kill the engkanto.

The engkanto, who stopped in her tracks for she fears water, rushes to Richard and choked him hardly. The young man can hear what the latter was saying: he (Richard) was the one she needed. Paeng, meanwhile tossed the matches in the air, burning the tree and killing the engkanto.

With all things seem to be alright, the remaining band members visit Paeng's home where his father warmly welcomed him. But, something in their plans went horribly wrong: Mang Lucio informs them that destroying an engkanto's home will not kill her, but only leave her temporarily homeless. She will only move into a new dwelling, for she is a spirit of nature. Mang Lucio was right: Richard was kidnapped by the reanimated engkanto and was never seen again. The next day in the resort, the surviving slave of the engkanto, that was hidden in a box, was revealed to have survived.

Cast

Christmas Tree
John Prats as Jong
Gina Alajar as Myrna
Boots Anson-Roa as Lola Susana
Tonton Gutierrez as Chuck
John Lapus as Yaya Sonny
Nash Aguas as Stephen
Sophia Marie Baars as Eunice
Lovi Poe as Hazel

Bangungot
Dennis Trillo as Jerome
Pauleen Luna as Florence
Roxanne Guinoo as Marionne/Red-Cloaked Figure
Jaymee Joaquin as Tatin
Jayson Gainza as Tonton
Andrea Torres as Schoolgirl
Eugene Domingo as Woman
Barbie Forteza as Young Marionne

Engkanto
Katrina Halili as Engkanto
Matt Evans as Richard
Melissa Ricks as Dang
Mart Escudero as Vince
Jewel Mische as Tonee
Sam Concepcion as Paeng
Felix Roco as Ian
Jojo Alejar as Hans
Nanding Josef as Lucio
Hector Macaso as Tikoy

Accolades

See also
Shake, Rattle & Roll (film series)
List of ghost films

References

External links

2007 horror films
Philippine horror films
9
Engkanto films
2000s Tagalog-language films
2000s Christmas horror films
2000s comedy horror films
Regal Entertainment films
2007 comedy films
2007 films
Films directed by Mike Tuviera
Films directed by Topel Lee